Mykhailo Mykhailovych Kotsiubynsky, (September 17, 1864 – April 25, 1913) was a Ukrainian author whose writings described typical Ukrainian life at the start of the 20th century. Kotsiubynsky's early stories were described as examples of ethnographic realism; in the years to come, with his style of writing becoming more and more sophisticated, he evolved into one of the most talented Ukrainian impressionist and modernist writers. The popularity of his novels later led to some of them being made into Soviet movies.

Life
He grew up in Bar, Vinnytsia region and several other towns and villages in Podolia, where his father worked as a civil servant. He attended the Sharhorod Religious Boarding School from 1876 until 1880. He continued his studies at the Kamianets-Podilskyi Theological Seminary, but in 1882 he was expelled from the school for his political activities within the socialist movement. Already he had been influenced by the awakening Ukrainian national idea. His first attempts at writing prose in 1884 were also written in the Ukrainian language: Andriy Soloviyko(Ukrainian: Андрій Соловійко).

Early work and research
From 1888 to 1890, he was a member of the Vinnytsia Municipal Duma. In 1890, he visited Galicia, where he met several other Ukrainian cultural figures including Ivan Franko and Volodymyr Hnatiuk. It was there in Lviv that his first story Nasha Khatka (Ukrainian: Наша хатка) was published.

During this period, he worked as a private tutor in and near Vinnytsia. There, he could study life in traditional Ukrainian villages, which was something he often came back to in his stories including the 1891 Na Viru (Ukrainian: На віру) and the 1901 Dorohoiu tsinoiu (Ukrainian: Дорогою ціною).

During large parts of the years 1892 to 1897, he worked for a commission studying the grape pest phylloxera in Bessarabia and Crimea. During the same period, he was a member of the secret Brotherhood of Taras.

He moved to Chernihiv in 1898 where he worked as a statistician at the statistics bureau of the Chernihiv zemstvo. He also was active in the Chernigov Governorate Scholarly Archival Commission and headed the Chernihiv Prosvita society from 1906 to 1908.

Writings

After the Russian Revolution of 1905, Kotsiubynsky could be more openly critical of the Russian tsarist regime, which can be seen in Vin ide (Ukrainian: Він іде) and Smikh (Ukrainian: Сміх), both from 1906, and Persona grata from 1907.

Fata Morgana, in two parts from 1904 and 1910, is probably his best-known work. Here he describes the typical social conflicts in the life of the Ukrainian village.

About twenty novels were published during Kotsiubynsky's life. Several of them have been translated into other European languages.

English translations 
English translations of Mykhaylo Kotsyubynsky’s works include:
 Short stories, “On the Road” and “The Unknown One” (Tr. from Ukrainian by Roma Franko.);
 "Fata Morgana" (Tr. from Ukrainian by Arthur Bernhard.).

Interesting facts 
 He was called the Sun Worshiper and the Sunflower, because above all he loved the sun, flowers and children. He served as an ordinary clerk in the statistical department of the Chernihiv administration, went to work with an essential flower in a boutonniere.
 He knew nine languages - three Slavic: Ukrainian, Russian, Polish; three Romance: French, Italian, Romanian; and three eastern ones: Tatar, Turkish and Romani. 
 Mykhailo Kotsyubynsky never received an official higher education (he graduated from the Shargorod Theological Seminary, and the university remained a dream).
 Mikhail's literary career began with a complete failure. In 1884 he wrote the short story "Andriy Solovko, or The Doctrine of the World and the Ignorance of Darkness." This first attempt by the young author was very skeptical. After that, he did not make new attempts for several years.
 It was his work that for the first time in Ukrainian literature included Impressionism, deep psychology, elements of expressionism, neorealism and others.
 Kotsyubynsky, an impressionist and a remarkable representative of psychologism, was also greatly influenced by Nechuy-Levytsky, Panas Mirnyi, Guy de Maupassant, Chekhov, Swedish writers, and a number of other notable writers.
 Kotsyubynsky was arrested in 1882 for his connection with the national liberation movement, and after his release the police established secret surveillance over him. His apartment was searched several times.
 Kotsyubynsky traveled a lot. He often visited Italy on the island of Capri.
 1970 at the film studio. Dovzhenko made a feature biographical film "The Kotsyubynsky Family".
 At the age of 12, young Mikhail fell in love with a 16-year-old girl, and in order to attract her attention, he decided to become a "great man", and for this he began to read books with special zeal. Thus, under the great influence of the work of T. Shevchenko and M. Vovchok, he has a desire to become a writer.

Death
Because of a heart disease, Kotsiubynsky spent long periods at different health resorts on Capri from 1909 to 1911. During the same period, he visited Greece and the Carpathians. In 1911 he was granted a pension from the Society of Friends of Ukrainian Scholarship, Literature, and Art that enabled him to quit his job and solely concentrate on his writings, but he was already in poor health and died only two years later.

Honors
During the Soviet period, Kotsiubynsky was honoured as a realist and a revolutionary democrat. A literary-memorial museum was opened in Vinnytsia in 1927 in the house where he was born. Later a memorial was created nearby the museum.

The house in Chernihiv where he lived for the last 15 years of his life was turned into a museum in 1934; the Chernihiv Regional Literary-. The house contains the author’s personal belongings. Adjacent to the house is a museum, which opened in 1983, containing Kotsiubinsky’s manuscripts, photos, magazines and family relics as well as information about other Ukrainian writers.

Several Soviet movies have been based on Kotsiubynsky’s novels such as Koni ne vynni (1956), Dorohoiu tsunoiu (1957) and Tini zabutykh predkiv (1967).

Family
In January 1896, he married Vira Ustymivna Kotsiubynska (Deisha) (1863–1921).

One of his sons, Yuriy Mykhailovych Kotsiubynsky (1896–1937), was the Bolshevik and the Red Army commander during the 1917–1921 Civil War. Later, he held several high positions within the Communist Party of Ukraine, but in 1935, he was expelled from the party. In October 1936, he was accused of having counter-revolutionary contacts and together with other Bolsheviks have organized a Ukrainian Trotskyist Centre. The year after, he was sentenced to death and executed. He was rehabilitated in 1955. Yuri had a son Oleh.

His daughter Oksana Kotsyubynska was married to Vitaliy Primakov.

The fate of his other children Roman and Iryna is less known.

His niece, Mykhailyna Khomivna Kotsiubynska (1931–2011), was the Ukrainian philologist and literary specialist. She was an honorary doctor of the Kyiv Mohyla Academy.

Further reading
 [http://www.ukrainians.ca/celebrities-news/3061-mykhailo-kotsiubynsky.html Mykhailo Kotsiubynsky Shadow of Ukrainian History
 Michailo Kotsiubinskij: Berättelser från Ukraina. Bokförlagsaktiebolaget Svithiod, Stockholm 1918.
 Ukraine. A Concise Encyclopædia, vol 1, p. 1032–1033. University of Toronto Press 1963.
 100 znamenytykh liudey Ukraïny, s.204–208. Folio, Kharkiv 2005. .
 Encyclopedia of Ukraine
 Ihor Siundiukov: The socio-esthetic ideal through the eyes of Mykhailo Kotsiubynsky. Den 2002, # 38.
 Volodymyr Panchenko: “I am better off alone”. Mykhailo Kotsiubynsky’s correspondence with his wife. Den 2005, # 40, 41.

References

External links
 
 

1864 births
1913 deaths
Writers from Vinnytsia
People from Vinnitsky Uyezd
Ukrainian novelists
Ukrainian male short story writers
Ukrainian short story writers
Mykhailo
Prosvita
People from Bar, Ukraine